The Worker's Marseillaise is a Russian revolutionary song named after La Marseillaise. It is based on a poem of  Pyotr Lavrov, first published on 1 July 1875 in London as A new song. The poem reflects a radical socialist program and calls for the violent destruction of the Russian monarchy. At the end of 1875 or in 1876, this poem began to be sung in Russia to the melody of the last verse of Robert Schumann's song Die beiden grenadiere. Schumann's melody is inspired by the original Marseillaise, but is noticeably different from it. Thus, the melody of the Worker's Marseillaise is only indirectly related to the original Marseillaise, and the lyrics not at all. The song is close to the cruel romance genre, and this influenced its popularity. The name the Worker's Marseillaise has been fixed since the 1890s.

It existed alongside several other popular versions, among others a Soldier's Marseillaise and a Peasant's Marseillaise.

This anthem was popular during the 1905 Russian Revolution and was used as a national anthem by the Russian Provisional Government until its overthrow in the October Revolution. It remained in use by Soviet Russia for a short time alongside The Internationale. During the 1917 Revolution it was played at all public assemblies, street demonstrations, concerts and plays.

Lyrics

See also
 La Marseillaise de la Commune, French revolutionary song created and used by the Paris Commune in 1871.
 Deutsche Arbeiter-Marseillaise (German Workers' Marseillaise), German revolutionary song

References

Bibliography
 

Historical national anthems
Russian anthems
Russian Revolution
Socialist Revolutionary Party
Socialist symbols
La Marseillaise